Kunda may refer to:

Places

Estonia
Kunda, Estonia, a town in Lääne-Viru County, Estonia
Kunda, Viru-Nigula Parish, a village in Viru-Nigula Parish, Lääne-Viru County, Estonia
Kunda River, a river in Lääne-Viru County, Estonia

India
Kunda, India, a town in Pratapgarh district in the Indian state of Uttar Pradesh
Kunda block, a community development block in Chatra district, Jharkhand
Kunda, Chatra, a village in Chatra district, Jharkhand

Others
Kunda, Burma, a settlement in Pindaya Township, Shan State, Burma
Khunda, a union council of Tehsil Lahore, Swabi District, Khyber Pakhtonkhwa, Pakistan
Kunda Park, Queensland, an industrial suburb in Sunshine Coast, Queensland, Australia
Kunda Station, a train station in Miyazu, Kyoto Prefecture, Japan

People
George Kunda (1956–2012), Zambian politician
Maksim Kunda (born 1989), Belarusian archer
Masahiro Kunda (born 1966), Japanese rugby union player
Stephen Kunda (born 1984), Zambian football player
Wendy Kunda (born 1997), Zambian female footballer
Ziva Kunda (1955–2004), Canadian social psychologist

Other uses
Kunda people, a Bantu-speaking ethnic group in Mozambique, Zambia, and Zimbabwe
Kunda culture, an archaeological culture classification, first discovered near Kunda, Estonia
Touré Kunda, a Senegalese band
Kunda, one of many names of a Temple tank, a well or reservoir built as part of Indian temple complexes

See also
Cunda (disambiguation)
Zambian surnames
Bemba-language surnames